The following page lists some power stations in mainland China divided by energy source and location.

Coal

Nuclear

Hydroelectric

Solar

Tide

Wind

By location
The following pages list the major power stations in China by province:

 List of major power stations in Anhui
 List of major power stations in Beijing
 List of major power stations in Chongqing
 List of major power stations in Fujian province
 List of major power stations in Gansu
 List of major power stations in Guangdong
 List of major power stations in Guangxi
 List of major power stations in Guizhou
 List of major power stations in Hainan province
 List of major power stations in Hebei province
 List of major power stations in Heilongjiang
 List of major power stations in Henan province
 List of power stations in Hong Kong
 List of major power stations in Hubei province
 List of major power stations in Hunan province
 List of major power stations in Inner Mongolia
 List of major power stations in Jiangsu province
 List of major power stations in Jiangxi province
 List of major power stations in Jilin province
 List of major power stations in Liaoning province
 List of power stations in Macau
 List of major power stations in Ningxia
 List of major power stations in Qinghai province
 List of major power stations in Shaanxi
 List of major power stations in Shandong
 List of major power stations in Shanghai
 List of major power stations in Shanxi
 List of major power stations in Sichuan
 List of major power stations in Tianjin
 List of major power stations in the Tibet Autonomous Region
 List of major power stations in Xinjiang
 List of major power stations in Yunnan
 List of major power stations in Zhejiang

See also 

 Energy policy of China
 List of largest power stations in the world
 List of offshore wind farms in China
 Renewable energy in China

References